Nardini may refer to:

 Nardini (surname), an Italian surname
 Bartolo Nardini, Italian producer of alcoholic drinks
 Nardini (automobile), French automobile
 Nardini (grappa), Italian wine